Zicrona caerulea, common name Blue Shieldbug, is a species of bugs of the family Pentatomidae.

Description
The body is uniformly metallic blue-green (hence the Latin name caerulea, meaning blue). In the immatures the abdomen is red with black markings.

These bugs are useful predators of leaf beetles in the genus Altica, of larvae of various beetles and caterpillars of moths, but it also feeds on plants. Eggs are laid in the spring. New adults of this univoltine species can be found from July onwards. This bug overwinters as an adult.

Distribution and habitat
This species is present in Eurasia and in North America. Its natural habitat consists of low vegetation in moors, heaths, damp grassland and forest edges.

References

 Fauna europaea
 Catalogue of Life
 British Bugs
 Nature Spot

External links
 Stages Chart on Flickriver
 Bugguide
 Commanster

Asopinae
Insects described in 1758
Articles containing video clips
Hemiptera of Asia
Hemiptera of Europe
Taxa named by Carl Linnaeus